Roma is a 2018 drama film written and directed by Alfonso Cuarón, who also produced, shot, and co-edited it. Set in 1970 and 1971, Roma follows the life of a live-in indigenous (Mixteco) housekeeper of an upper-middle-class Mexican family, as a semi-autobiographical take on Cuarón's upbringing in the Colonia Roma neighborhood of Mexico City. The film stars Yalitza Aparicio and Marina de Tavira in the leading roles. It is an international co-production between Mexico and the United States.

The film premiered at the 75th Venice International Film Festival on 30 August 2018, where it won the Golden Lion. It began a limited theatrical run in the United States on 21 November 2018, before streaming on Netflix in the US and other territories starting on 14 December 2018. The film received universal critical acclaim, with particular praise given to Cuarón's screenplay, direction and cinematography, as well as the performances of Aparicio and de Tavira. The film is considered to be one of the best films of 2018 and has been widely regarded by critics as one of the best films of the 2010s, and appeared on many critics' "top ten" lists of the year.

Roma received a number of accolades, with ten nominations at the 91st Academy Awards, among them Best Picture, Best Original Screenplay, Best Actress (Aparicio) and Best Supporting Actress (de Tavira). It became the first Mexican entry to win Best Foreign Language Film, and also won for Best Cinematography and Best Director, becoming the first foreign language film to win in the last category, as well as marking the first time a director won Best Cinematography for their own film. It was tied with The Favourite as the most-nominated film of the show, and with Crouching Tiger, Hidden Dragon (2000) for the most Academy Award nominations ever received by a non-English language film. It also won Best Director and Best Foreign Language Film at the 76th Golden Globe Awards, Best Picture and Best Director at the 24th Critics' Choice Awards, and Best Film, Best Film Not in the English Language, Best Direction and Best Cinematography at the 72nd British Academy Film Awards.

Plot
In 1970, Cleodegaria "Cleo" Gutiérrez is a Mixtec live-in maid in an upper-middle-class household in the Colonia Roma neighborhood of Mexico City. The household consists of the mother Sofía; the father Antonio; their four school-aged children; and Sofía's elderly mother, Teresa. Antonio, a doctor, often leaves for business conferences, but Sofía's distressed reactions to his absences suggest he is actually having an affair. 

Meanwhile, Cleo believes she might be pregnant. She tells her boyfriend, Fermín, who pretends to be supportive but then abandons her at a movie theatre. She nervously reveals her news to Sofía, who provides emotional comfort and takes her to the hospital, confirming her pregnancy. Sofía then takes Cleo and the children to a family friend's hacienda for New Year celebrations. Recent tensions over land in the area arise, and a large forest fire erupts that the party-goers help extinguish. 

Returning to the city, Cleo passes Antonio and a young woman flirting on the street. Cleo decides to look for Fermín, eventually travelling to an impoverished rural region, where she discovers him training at a military-style camp run by Professor Zovek. Fermín refuses to acknowledge that the baby is his, threatening to beat Cleo and their child if she talks to him again.

Cleo returns to the city, and the increasingly unhinged Sofía tries unsuccessfully to conceal her husband's infidelity from their children. With the baby almost due, Teresa takes Cleo shopping for a crib downtown. Suddenly, a student protest outside the store turns into a massacre as a paramilitary group, Los Halcones (The Hawks), attacks the protestors. The militants chase a student into the store and murder him. Fermín, appearing as one of Los Halcones, points a gun at Cleo and Teresa before wordlessly exiting. Stressed, Cleo's water breaks. The violence in the streets slows traffic and her attempt to get to the hospital. When she arrives at last, Antonio briefly appears to reassure Cleo, but makes an excuse to leave. She cries in agony as her baby girl is delivered stillborn.

Later, Sofía takes Cleo and the children on a family holiday to the beaches at Tuxpan. Finally, Sofía reveals to her children that she and their father are separating, and that the holiday is giving Antonio time to collect his belongings from their home. At the beach, two of the children are almost carried off by a strong current, but Cleo wades in and saves them, despite not knowing how to swim. Sofía and the children affirm their love for Cleo, all of them holding each other and crying, while Cleo confesses that she did not want her baby to be born. The group returns home to find the house reorganized, and Cleo prepares a load of clothes for washing.

Cast

Production

On 8 September 2016, it was announced that Alfonso Cuarón would write and direct a project focusing on a Mexican family living in Mexico City in the 1970s. Production was set to begin in fall 2016 by his own production company Esperanto Filmoj and Participant Media. The film was produced by Cuarón, Gabriela Rodríguez, and Nicolás Celis. Filming began from 27 November 2016 to 14 March 2017. Cuarón stated I "just wrote the script without looking back. I started page one, I finish it, I never read it again as a whole. I never share it with anyone."

Roma was shot in sequence, which Yalitza Aparicio, who plays Cleo, said helped her. She was most terrified by the scene on the beach, as she—like her character—could not swim. Before being cast, Aparicio, who had recently completed graduate training in pre-school education, had no acting experience or formal training in acting. She has joked that the only "acting" she has ever done was lying to her parents and teachers.

Filming took place on-location throughout Mexico City, as Cuarón felt shooting on soundstages would be difficult for first-time actors. The movie theatre serving as a recurring location was the Teatro Metropólitan, where Cuarón had premiered Y tu mamá también in 2001.

Robbery on set
On 1 November 2016, the crew of Roma was the target of a robbery. According to the studio, "two women were hit, five crew members were hospitalized, and cellphones, wallets, and jewelry were stolen" during the attack. The crew reportedly arrived to set up filming for the day when a group of city workers approached the crew and tried to shut down filming. The crew stated they had permission to film, but the workers persisted and a brawl broke out between the groups.

Release

In April 2018, it was announced Netflix had acquired distribution rights to the film. Netflix movie chief Scott Stuber acquired the rights based on 12 minutes of footage he was shown.

A teaser trailer was released on 25 July 2018.

The film had its world premiere at the 75th Venice International Film Festival on 30 August 2018, and made its North American debut the next day at the Telluride Film Festival. The film also played at the Toronto International Film Festival. It was screened at the San Sebastián International Film Festival on 27 September 2018, the New York Film Festival on 5October 2018, and the 29th New Orleans Film Festival as the Centerpiece Film on 22 October 2018. The film was released at independent theatres in Mexico on 21 November; however, the Cinépolis and Cinemex chains refused, as they demanded a longer exclusivity window than what Netflix offered. Released digitally on 14 December, the film was watched by 3.2 million households between January and February 2019, with a peak of 418,000 viewers on 23 February, the day before the Academy Awards.

After Roma was nominated for Best Picture at the 91st Academy Awards, AMC Theatres and Regal Cinemas both issued statements saying that Roma would not be part of the line-up at either chain's annual Best Picture showcase. AMC said in their statement that this was due to them never receiving a license from Netflix to screen Roma in their theaters. Both theaters chains have refused to screen films from Netflix due to their policies that require a minimum of 90 days between theatrical release and home viewing.

The eligibility of the film for the Academy Awards was a matter of controversy in the US film industry, since despite the film's limited theatrical release, many believed it to have been made for home viewing. In March 2019, Steven Spielberg expressed disapproval of streaming films being eligible for Academy Awards, and the timing of his comments led commentators to believe they were a response to Roma, although he did not mention the film by name.

The film received the biggest promotional campaign in Netflix's history, with anywhere from $25 million to $50 million in advertisements (with Netflix insisting on the former figure and its rivals on the latter). One unique tactic included sending out thousands of six-pound Roma coffee table books (worth $175) to awards voters, which led a consultant to say "the shipping charges cost more than some movies' advertising budgets".

Reception

Box office
While Netflix has not publicly disclosed box-office figures for Roma, sources deduced that the film made $90,000–120,000 from three theaters in its opening weekend, 23–25 November, and a total of $200,000 over the five-day Thanksgiving frame, including selling out theaters in Los Angeles and New York City. Had the results been officially reported, its approximate venue average of $66,600 would have ranked among the best ever for a foreign-language film. In its second weekend of theatrical release, the film expanded to 17 theaters. IndieWire estimated the film grossed $110,000 from four of them, including selling out in San Francisco, and that the film would "easily be the best grossing subtitled film" of 2018. In its third weekend, the film made another estimated $500,000 from 100 theaters, for a running total of $900,000.

Despite being released on Netflix on Friday, 14 December, the film expanded to 145 theaters and grossed an estimated $362,000, for a four-week total of $1.4 million. It made another $300,000 the following week and $150,000 the week after that. By its ninth week of release, the film had made an estimated $2.8 million. In the weekend following the announcement of its 10 Oscar nominations, Roma grossed another $175,000 from around 80 theaters, pushing it past $3 million, the first foreign language film to do so domestically since Ida in 2013.

Critical response
The website's critical consensus reads, "Roma finds writer-director Alfonso Cuarón in complete, enthralling command of his visual craft – and telling the most powerfully personal story of his career." On Metacritic, the film has a weighted average score of 96 out of 100, based on 50 critics, indicating "universal acclaim". It is the 26th highest-rated film of all-time on the site, and the best-reviewed of 2018.

Writing for The Guardian, Peter Bradshaw said "Roma is thrilling, engrossing, moving – and just entirely amazing, an adjectival pileup of wonder. He has reached back into his own childhood to create an intensely personal story." Likewise, Manohla Dargis of The New York Times called the film "an expansive, emotional portrait of life buffeted by violent forces, and a masterpiece" and praised Cuarón's use of "intimacy and monumentality to express the depths of ordinary life".

Slavoj Žižek argued that people were appreciating the film for the wrong reasons, claiming that people were appreciating Cleo's grace too much, without seeing the way that Cleo needs to break free from the moral constraints placed upon her.

According to a study of 65 indigeneity-oriented fictional features produced in Latin America in the 21st century, the film can be considered as a catalyst for change in the blueprint for representations of Indigenous characters in cinema. Roma depicts Cleo, the main Indigenous character, to a level of detail that there is no room for stereotypical portrayals. Gonzalez Rodriguez asserts that the film is a unique example of syntonic indigeneity as it challenges traditional representations of the Indigenous Other as an exotic figure (histrionic indigeneity).

Accolades

Roma won the Golden Lion for Best Film at the Venice International Film Festival. At the Toronto International Film Festival, it was also named second runner-up for the People's Choice Award.

The film received 10 nominations for the 91st Academy Awards, including Best Picture—thereby tying with The Favourite as the most-nominated film. It is also the first film distributed primarily by a streaming service that has been nominated for Best Picture. It is also tied with Crouching Tiger, Hidden Dragon (2000) for the most Oscar nominations ever received by a film not in the English language. It ultimately won three Academy Awards, including Best Foreign Language Film, becoming the first Mexican film to win this honor.

Roma received American Film Institute's 2018 AFI Special Award, as it was not eligible for AFI Movies of the Year due to its foreign-language status. It was chosen by Time magazine and the New York Film Critics Circle as the best film of 2018, and by the National Board of Review as one of the top ten best films of 2018.

The February 2020 issue of New York lists Roma as one of the Best Movies That Lost Best Picture at the Oscars.

Home media 
On 15 November 2019, it was confirmed that Roma would be receiving a DVD and Blu-ray release from The Criterion Collection, marking the first time a Netflix original film was added to the library, and one of the rare times that Netflix had permitted one of their films for physical media release. Netflix described the announcement as "such an honor". To coincide with the Criterion Collection release, in February 2020 Netflix released a behind-the-scenes documentary named Road to Roma.

See also
 List of Mexican submissions for the Academy Award for Best Foreign Language Film
 List of submissions to the 91st Academy Awards for Best Foreign Language Film

References

External links

 Official site
 
 
 
 

2018 films
2018 drama films
2010s feminist films
2010s pregnancy films
American black-and-white films
American drama films
American pregnancy films
BAFTA winners (films)
Best Film BAFTA Award winners
Best Foreign Film in the Spanish Language Goya Award Winners
Best Foreign Language Film Academy Award winners
Best Foreign Language Film BAFTA Award winners
Best Foreign Language Film Golden Globe winners
Films directed by Alfonso Cuarón
Films produced by Alfonso Cuarón
Films set in 1970
Films set in 1971
Films set in Mexico City
Films shot in Mexico
Films whose cinematographer won the Best Cinematography Academy Award
Films whose director won the Best Directing Academy Award
Films whose director won the Best Direction BAFTA Award
Films whose director won the Best Director Golden Globe
Films with screenplays by Alfonso Cuarón
Golden Lion winners
Independent Spirit Award for Best Foreign Film winners
2018 independent films
Maids in films
Mexican black-and-white films
Mexican drama films
Mexican pregnancy films
Participant (company) films
Spanish-language Netflix original films
2010s Spanish-language films
Mixtec-language films
2010s American films
2010s Mexican films